Consul is a free and open-source service networking platform developed by HashiCorp.

Overview
Consul was initially released in 2014 as a service discovery platform. In addition to service discovery, it now provides a full-featured service mesh for secure service segmentation across any cloud or runtime environment, and distributed key-value storage for application configuration. 

Registered services and nodes can be queried using a DNS interface or an HTTP interface. Envoy proxy provides security, observability, and resilience for all application traffic.

See also
 Envoy (software)
 Open Service Mesh

References

External links
 
 GitHub - hashicorp/consul

Network software
Free and open-source software